Fromohio (stylized as fROMOHIO) is the third album by the American alternative rock band Firehose, released in 1989. The album maintained the acoustic and folky sound of If'n.

Production
The album was recorded in singer-guitarist Ed Crawford's home state of Ohio.

Critical reception
The Los Angeles Times wrote that the band "balance their familiar dice 'n' slice, genre-leapin' riffin' with more straightforward song structures." The Chicago Tribune thought that "Crawford's guitar-playing is becoming a more integral part of the band's three-pronged attack. [Mike] Watt's bass and [George] Hurley's drums remain at the core of the band's sound, a dynamic synthesis of punk, funk and free jazz that was pioneered by the Minutemen." The Ottawa Citizen wrote: "Imagine a technically imperfect band that has the art of free-form fusion mastered."

Trouser Press called the album Firehose's "best, most accessible work," writing that Crawford "has absorbed a bit of his bandmates’ eccentricities, and his voice has lost some of its shriller edges." The Rough Guide to Rock thought that, "in the best possible way, it was a very American record, rich in tradition and innovation."

Track listing
 "Riddle of the Eighties" - 2:00
 "In My Mind" - 2:16
 "Whisperin' While Hollerin'" - 2:04
 "Vastopol" (Elizabeth Cotten) - 1:24
 "Más Cojones" - 2:02
 "What Gets Heard" - 2:19
 "Let the Drummer Have Some" - 0:59
 "Liberty for Our Friend" - 2:06
 "Time With You" - 3:13
 "If’n" - 3:14
 "Some Things" - 2:43
 "Understanding" - 3:12
 "'Nuf That Shit, George" - 0:46
 "The Softest Hammer" - 3:03

Personnel

 Ed Crawford: Guitar, vocals
 George Hurley: Drums
 Mike Watt: Bass, voices
 Kira Roessler: Guitar, vocals

References

External links
Album online  on Radio3Net a radio channel of Romanian Radio Broadcasting Company

Firehose (band) albums
1989 albums
SST Records albums